The Last Man on Earth is an American post-apocalyptic comedy television series created by and starring Will Forte. The series premiered on Fox on March 1, 2015. On April 8, 2015, the show was renewed for a second season, which premiered on September 27, 2015. On March 24, 2016, the show was renewed for a third season, which premiered on September 25, 2016. On May 10, 2017, Fox renewed the series for a fourth season, which premiered on October 1, 2017.

On May 10, 2018, Fox canceled the series after four seasons.

Series overview

Episodes

Season 1 (2015)

Season 2 (2015–16)

Season 3 (2016–17)

Season 4 (2017–18)

Ratings

References

External links
 

Last Man on Earth, The
Last Man on Earth, The